Bina Magar, is a Nepalese politician. She is the water supply minister of Nepal. She was a leader of Nepal Communist Party. Magar is daughter-in-law of former Prime Minister Pushpa Kamal Dahal and third wife of Late Prakash Dahal.

See also
 List of Nepalese politicians

References

External links
 Official website of Nepal Communist Party
 Official website of Ministry of Water Supply
 Personal Official website  

Living people
Nepal Communist Party (NCP) politicians
Nepal MPs 2017–2022
Communist Party of Nepal (Maoist Centre) politicians
1983 births